Leucauge ditissima, is a species of spider of the genus Leucauge. It is found in Sri Lanka and Myanmar.

See also
 List of Tetragnathidae species

References

ditissima
Endemic fauna of Sri Lanka
Spiders of Asia
Spiders described in 1887